Rodd Kneeland (born June 17, 1966) is an American professional stock car racing driver. He currently competes part-time in the ARCA Menards Series West driving the No. 68 Chevrolet for his own team, Rodd Racing.

Racing career

Beginnings 
Kneeland's passion for racing came from winning three tickets to a NASCAR Winston West Series race at Sonoma Raceway in 1977. In high school, Kneeland had a '69 Camaro and was a part of the local racing scene, when he decided to try racing on a track, starting to race his Camaro and dirt modifieds.

ARCA Menards Series West 

Kneeland would first make an attempt in the 2008 NASCAR Camping World West Series, but failed to qualify for the event. His first start would be in the 2009 NASCAR Camping World West Series at Madera Speedway, finishing 14th. Since then, he has only competed in NASCAR races in his home state of California.

Personal life 
Kneeland currently works two full-time jobs. He works as an engineer at the Sonoma Valley Fire Department and is part of his family's construction company in Sonoma, California. Kneeland had a brother, Todd, who died in a fiery car accident on August 16, 2015. Kneeland's Wife, Jenise Kneeland, passed away on June 10, 2022 due to complications from cancer.

Motorsports career results

ARCA Menards Series West 
(key) (Bold – Pole position awarded by qualifying time. Italics – Pole position earned by points standings or practice time. * – Most laps led.)

References

External links 
Rodd Kneeland career statistics on Racing-Reference

1966 births

Living people
ARCA Menards Series drivers
NASCAR drivers
Racing drivers from California
People from Sonoma, California